Garden Wreath is a 1997 sculpture by American artist Larry Kirkland, located in the entry foyer of the Central Library in Portland, Oregon.

Description and history 
Funded by Multnomah County's Percent for Art program, the suspended ellipse sculpture measures  x  and is made of gilded and coppered aluminum leaves. It displays images and text, and introduces the artist's "Garden of Knowledge" series, which also includes Garden Stair and Solar Wreath (1997). According to the Regional Arts & Culture Council, these three works relate "in form, materials and metaphor", illustrating Kirkland's belief that the library is "a place where people explore, uncover and learn". The work is part of the City of Portland and Multnomah County Public Art Collection courtesy of the Regional Arts & Culture Council.

See also
 1997 in art

References

External links

 Garden Wreath at the Public Art Archive
 Portland Cultural Tours: Public Art Walking Tour (PDF), Regional Arts & Culture Council

1997 establishments in Oregon
1997 sculptures
Aluminum sculptures in Oregon
Southwest Portland, Oregon